Jose Lino Alvarez (born April 12, 1956) is a retired Major League Baseball pitcher. He played four seasons at the major league level, pitching for the Atlanta Braves. He played for the Braves in 1981 and 1982, then spent five seasons in the minor leagues before returning to the Braves in 1988 and 1989.  After a successful season in 1988 and earning the Atlanta Braves Most Outstanding Pitcher Award, Jose began the 1989 season in fine fashion with 2 wins and a save.

Álvarez attended the University of Southwestern Louisiana, now the University of Louisiana at Lafayette where he played baseball for the USL Ragin' Cajuns Baseball team. Jose was inducted in the Ragin Cajun HOF 2019, Hillsborough High School HOF 2008, Clarinda A's HOF 1998.

Alvarez played his first professional season with the Braves Rookie league Kingsport Braves in 1978, and his last with their Triple-A club, the Richmond Braves, in 1995.  He currently resides in Greenville, South Carolina. He has coached youth baseball and high school baseball in Greenville.

He has been on serving with FCA since 2007.

Jose and his wife Michelle Alvarez speak at FamilyLife marriage conferences around the country called "Weekend To Remember".  He is the father of three grown children, and he and his wife are grandparents to four.

References

External links

1956 births
Living people
Atlanta Braves players
Nashville Sounds players
Richmond Braves players
Major League Baseball pitchers
Minor league baseball managers
Baseball players from Tampa, Florida
Louisiana Ragin' Cajuns baseball players